Melathiruppanthuruthi is a panchayat town in Thanjavur district in the Indian state of Tamil Nadu.South India's Cleanest town panchayat and best in Solid waste management in south zone awarded by central government of India  (swachh survekshan) 2019-2020 (under 25000 population category).

Geography
Melathiruppanthuruthi(MTT) is located in latitude and longitude of 10.865887,79.079075. keela thiruppanthruthi in the east and Thiruvalam pozhil in the west side and Kudamurutti river in the south side. Kudamurutti river water is the major sources for Drinking, agriculture and other uses for the entire village.

Geology  

Melathiruppanthuruthi is situated in the bank of Kudamurutti river, a tributary of the Kaveri, is one of the five sacred rivers flows between Thiruvaiyaru and Thanjavur District. Soil is fertile and highly suited for cultivation. Most of the population are depend upon farming as regular income .

Demographics

Population 

 India census, Melathiruppanthuruthi had a population of 25000. Males constitute 47.43% of the population and females 52.56%. Melathiruppanthuruthi has an average literacy rate of 72%, higher than the national average of 59.5%: male literacy is 78%, and female literacy is 66%. In Melathiruppanthuruthi, 13% of the population is under 6 years of age.

Government and politics

Civic Utility / Amenities / Services  
 Cleanest town panchayat in 2019-2020 (swachh survekshan- 2020- south zone) awarded by central government of India 
 South India's best and Tamil Nadu No: 01 position in Solid waste Management system in the year 2020 (For reference: swachh survekshan- 2020- south zone).
 Electric vehicles are used for collection of waste from entire area.
 Segregation of waste while collecting such as Compostable (Paper,wooden pieces, etc.)  and non compostible materials (plastic related) and Green (leaves, branches, shrubs, etc.)
 Zero cost plant- Town panchayat itself giving plant to each and every homes free of cost to make our locality more green.
 Zero plastics - shops, market, grocery are using only decomposible bags and intimate them to avoid using of plastics.
 Indian Bank ATM and CUB ATM was available in main road of MTT and HP petrol station available 1.5 Kms from village.
 33/11 kV substation by TNEB was available outside (2.5 kms away) from the resident area.

Economy 
Land is suitable for the all kind of crops, but mostly the area cultivates
 paddy
 plantain
 Sugar cane
 sesame
 maize
 Betel Leaf
 Black gram
 Coconut tree

Transport 
Capital of Tamil Nadu- Chennai is approximately 325 km distance.

By Air  
Nearby airport is Thiruchirapalli International Airport (IATA Code: TRZ) which is 65 kms from MTT.

By Rail  
Nearby railway station is Thanjavur Railway Station (Railway Code: TJ), 16 kms away from MTT.

By Road  
Thanjavur is nearby city for Melathirupanthuruthi distance of 14 kms,
Thiruvaiyaru is nearby town with distance of 5 kms.
 Thanjavur-14 kms
 Thirukattupalli-15 kms
 Basilica of Our Lady of Lourdes (Poondi)-21 kms
 Kallanai Dam-29 kms
 Thiruvaiyaru-5 kms

Education 
 Government higher secondary school (Grade-06 to 12)
 Government Elementary school (Grade -01 to 05)
 Crescent Nursery and primary school- Private (Grade LKG To 5)
 Mahatma Nursery and primary school- Private (Grade LKG To 5)

Gallery

References

Cities and towns in Thanjavur district